Togo (TOG) has competed in the nine African Games since taking part in the inaugural Games in 1965. Athletes from Togo have won a total of eighteen medals.

Medal tables

Medals by Games

Below is a table representing all Togolese medals won at the Games. The original count at the 2007 event was a single bronze medal but Florence Ezeh's award was subsequently raised to a silver medal due to a competitor being disqualified.

See also 
 Togo at the Olympics
 Togo at the Paralympics
 Sport in Togo

References